Runowo may refer to the following places:
Runowo, Czarnków-Trzcianka County in Greater Poland Voivodeship (west-central Poland)
Runowo, Poznań County in Greater Poland Voivodeship (west-central Poland)
Runowo, Wągrowiec County in Greater Poland Voivodeship (west-central Poland)
Runowo, Pomeranian Voivodeship (north Poland)
Runowo, Warmian-Masurian Voivodeship (north Poland)
Runowo, West Pomeranian Voivodeship (north-west Poland)